Koppiyam is an Indian Tamil-language anthology and crime show that premiered on 2 October 2012 on Raj TV which shows the claims of paranormal happenings around Tamil Nadu. As of 2021, it is still on-air. It airs through weekday nights. The show has exceeded 2200 episodes and it ended on 28 March 2021.

External links
 Raj TV Official Site 

Raj TV television series
2013 Tamil-language television series debuts
Tamil-language television shows